Nelson's Green Brier Distillery is a popular whiskey distillery located in downtown Nashville, Tennessee that produces different varieties of Tennessee whiskey and bourbons. The distillery, located at 1414 Clinton St. Nashville, Tennessee 37203, offers daily tours and tastings as well as a large mercantile shop with bottles, barware and apparel available for purchase. As of summer 2023, Nelson's Green Brier Distillery will open a restaurant and bar as well as several private event and dining spaces available to rent for corporate functions, weddings and celebrations of varying sizes. 

The original Nelson's Green Brier Distillery was a pre-Prohibition historical distillery that operated under the ownership of businessman Charles Nelson and later his widow, Louisa, in Greenbrier, Robertson County, Tennessee, from 1870 to 1909.

The brand was re-launched by the Nelsons' great-great-great grandsons in 2011 and they began operating in 2014 in Nashville, Tennessee producing award-winning Belle Meade Bourbon, Nelson's Green Brier Tennessee whiskey, Nelson Brothers bourbons, and other spirits.

The historical Nelson's Green Brier Distillery 

The original Nelson's Green Brier Distillery was located on Rocky Fork Creek in Greenbrier, Robertson County, Tennessee. It operated from 1867 until it was shut down in 1909 when Tennessee enacted state-level Prohibition of alcoholic beverages.

The distillery was acquired in 1870 by Charles Nelson, a Nashville businessman who expanded operations in the ensuing years. The whiskey produced there was sold in other parts of the United States under the label "Nelson's Best".

In 1885, the distillery produced 380,000 U.S. gallons (1,400,000 liters) of whiskey, making it the largest producer of sour mash whiskey in Robertson County during a time when whiskey production was a major industry in Tennessee and the county was one of the state's largest producers. At that time, the annual production capacity of the Jack Daniel's distillery in Lynchburg was 23,000 U.S. gallons (87,000 liters).

Nelson's Green Brier Distillery was a major contributor to the economy and growth of the town of Greenbrier (spelled as one word) during the late 19th century. It employed about 25 people directly and provided a market for local farmers' corn, locally-made barrels and other local products. Its presence led to the construction of a railroad line and station in Greenbrier.

Whiskey production at the distillery ended after Tennessee enacted prohibition on July 1, 1909, but whiskey produced before that date continued to be sold in other states until 1915. Robertson County whiskey had a reputation for superior quality, but the county's whiskey industry was not revived after Prohibition ended.

The distillery equipment was salvaged and shipped to Canada in 1923 to be used for distilling there by Seagram.

The site was added to the National Register of Historic Places in 2008. The distillery's listing on the National Register of Historic Places is due to its historical importance in industry and commerce in the state. Additionally, proprietor Charles Nelson was active in the banking, farming and barrel-making industries. The listed property includes a 5-acre (2.0 ha) area, although the distillery occupied a much larger area. Most of the distillery buildings are no longer present, and the only historical buildings remaining include an early 20th-century warehouse, a spring house that supplied fresh water to the distillery and a barrel house. The site includes a dam across Rocky Fork Creek, an old mash tub and remnants of building foundations.

Revival of the brand
In 2011, two of the great-great-great-grandsons of Charles Nelson – Charlie and Andy Nelson – announced a plan to revive the Nelson's brand and produce whiskey using Charles Nelson's recipes. In 2013, they began bottling whiskey under the label Belle Meade Bourbon – a brand name used historically by Nelson's – while they waited on the permits and equipment necessary to open their own distillery.

On November 23, 2014, the new Nelson's Green Brier Distillery opened in Nashville. Tours highlight the history of the Nelson's Green Brier brand name and the previous distillery, and include tastings and a visit to the production floor. Constellation Brands (through its investment branch Constellation Ventures) bought a minority stake in the company in 2016 and a majority stake in 2019. The Nelson brothers, Andy and Charlie Nelson, remain heavily involved in the business today .

Current product offerings

Tennessee whiskey

Nelson's Green Brier Tennessee Whiskey: 
(Awarded Double Gold , SIP Awards, 2022) Launched in 2019, Nelson's Green Brier Tennessee Whiskey is based on the recipe for Charles Nelson's original Tennessee Whiskey, making its modern-day bottling the first since 1909. Filtered through a mellowing bed of sugar maple charcoal and aged in new charred oak barrels this wheated mash bill recipe is credited with being the original Tennessee whiskey. Nelson's Green Brier Tennessee Whiskey is available in all 50 states.

Tasting Notes: 
Nose: Full and warm showing caramel, vanilla, cinnamon, and apple

Palate: Robust brown sugar, cinnamon roll, caramel apple, and a touch cocoa

Finish: Long with lingering flavors of cinnamon, brown sugar, Gala apple, and black cherry.

Alcohol Content: 
91 Proof (45.5% ABV)

Mash Bill: 
Corn, Wheat and Malted Barley

Bourbons

Nelson Brothers Classic Bourbon: 
(Awarded BEST IN SHOW/American Blended Straight Bourbon, TAG Global Spirits Awards, 2023) An expert blend of exceptional, high-rye, straight bourbon whiskeys, well-aged in new, charred American oak barrels and carefully crafted to be equally pleasing neat, on the rocks, or in a favorite cocktail. Nelson Brothers Classic Bourbon is available in all 50 states.

Tasting Notes: 
Nose: spice cake, cherry, milk chocolate, vanilla, baked apple 

Palate: banana bread, cocoa, cherry, dried pineapple

Finish: black peppercorn, spearmint, lemon peel, sweet tobacco

Alcohol Content: 
93.3 Proof (46.65% ABV)

Mash Bill: 
Corn, Rye, Malted Barley

Nelson Brothers Reserve Bourbon: 
(Awarded #10 Top 20 Whiskies of 2022, Whisky Advocate) The process begins with selecting the choicest lots of well-aged bourbon barrels in the Nelson’s Green Brier Distillery inventory. These barrels would craft the ideal foundation of flavor and fragrance to forge this truly premium and balanced expression. Once singled out, the exceptional sources are expertly batched into a superior, high-proof blend, rich with rye, and redolent of dark cherry, caramel, and spice. The result is Nelson Brothers Reserve, a bourbon certain to startle and delight anyone who comes within sipping distance. Nelson Brothers Reserve Bourbon is available in all 50 states.

Tasting Notes: 
Nose: cherry, maple syrup, sweet mint, cinnamon roll 

Palate: caramel, allspice, cherry, hazelnut

Finish: earthy, cocoa, allspice, cherry cobbler

Alcohol Content 
107.8 Proof (53.9% ABV)

Mash Bill 
Corn, Rye, Malted Barley

Nelson Brothers Sherry Cask Finish Bourbon: 
Nelson Brothers’ Cask Finish Series represents a glorious union of tradition and creativity in the distiller’s craft: select barrels of celebrated bourbon are enlivened by the characteristic aromas and flavors of the special casks that host the final stage of the aging process. The Oloroso casks selected by the Nelson Brothers team restore the robustness and fortitude of sherry’s true Spanish character. When Nelson Brothers bourbon enters those casks for its final stage of aging, the results draw out the dark colors, sweet notes (brown sugar, vanilla, raisins), and long, warm finish—with a hint of spicy bite. Nelson Brothers Sherry Cask Finish Bourbon is available in select states.

Tasting Notes 
Nose: Black cherry, almond, raisin, stone fruit, vanilla amaretto, vanilla bean

Palate: Vanilla, caramel, banana nut bread, cinnamon, crème brûlée, citrus, eucalyptus, rye spice

Finish: Christmas fruit cake, molasses, black tea, spearmint, cherry

Alcohol Content 
100 proof (50% ABV)

Mash Bill 
Corn, Rye, Malted Barley

Nelson Brothers Mourvèdre Cask Finish 
When Nelson Brothers’ bourbon meets the casks provided by Withers Winery in the Sierra Foothills, the result is an irresistible mélange of aromas and flavors—almond, cherry, sandalwood, currant, black licorice, cumin—that magnifies the best elements of both grape and grain. Nelson Brothers Mourvèdre Cask Finish Bourbon is available in select states.

Tasting Notes 
Nose: almond, cherry cobbler, sandalwood

Palate: currant, black licorice, cumin

Finish: black tea, sweet mint, honey

Alcohol Content 
107.5 Proof (53.75% ABV)

Mash Bill 
Corn, Rye, Malted Barley

Other spirits 
Louisa's Coffee Caramel Pecan Liqueur 

Louisa Nelson was a woman of remarkable strength and character who ran Nelson's Green Brier Distillery from 1891 until Prohibition shuttered it in 1909. She grew the distillery into one of the largest in the country at the time despite the great odds against her, including not having the right to vote. Nelson's Green Brier Distillery has created this line of liqueurs in her honor to help tell her story and teach the world about the pioneering spirit that she was.

Louisa's Liqueur shows robust flavors and aromas of caramel, coffee and pecans. As a liqueur, it is sweet but not too sweet, so it does well neat or on the rocks. It also makes a perfect addition to coffee or poured over ice cream, and it's great in a cocktail.

Alcohol Content 
40 Proof (20% ABV)

Previously Released Product Offerings

Belle Meade Bourbon 

Using family recipes, the Nelson brothers began using stock at a distillery in Indiana to start making Belle Meade Bourbon in 2012. After releasing the initial bourbon, they continued to add other variations that were finished in used barrels acquired from European distillers that featured different flavor profiles.

 Belle Meade Bourbon: a high-rye straight bourbon produced in small batches and bottled at 90 proof. It won a double gold medal at the 2015 San Francisco World Spirits Competition.
 Belle Meade Sherry Cask Finish: small batch whiskey finished in Spanish Oloroso sherry casks after originally aging nine years. It won a double gold medal and Best Special Barrel Finish Bourbon at the 2015 San Francisco World Spirits Competition.
 Belle Meade Cognac Cask Finish a slightly younger blend finished in Limousin oak casks formerly used to age Fine Champagne XO cognacs in France. It won a gold medal at the 2017 San Francisco World Spirits Competition.
 Belle Meade Madeira Cask Finish rests after aging in slightly larger barrels (59 gallons) previously used to age Madeira wine. It won a double gold medal at the 2017 San Francisco World Spirits Competition.
 Belle Meade Single Barrel Bourbon aged a minimum of nine years and bottled at cask strength, which lead to some variation in the final ABV. The proof ranges from 110 to 120 and is printed on the bottle along with the barrel number.

Nelson's First 108 Tennessee Whiskey 
(a limited, distillery only release) – that got its name from two things: the total number of barrels produced and the 108-year time gap that occurred between the company's forced shutdown due to Prohibition and its revival. Based on an original Charles Nelson recipe, the whiskey used the Lincoln County Process with wheat – as opposed to rye – providing the flavor. It was made available in a cask-strength (not diluted with water), single-barrel version and a 90-proof, small batch blend.

Nelson's Green Brier Tennessee White Whiskey 
(used the charcoal-based Lincoln County Process to mellow a recipe created more than 100 years ago. Single distilled, unaged and bottled at 91 proof, it incorporated a mash of barley, corn and wheat and won a bronze medal at the 2015 San Francisco World Spirits Competition.

See also
List of historic whisky distilleries

References

External links
 

Industrial buildings and structures on the National Register of Historic Places in Tennessee
Buildings and structures in Robertson County, Tennessee
Distilleries in Tennessee
National Register of Historic Places in Robertson County, Tennessee
Defunct manufacturing companies based in Tennessee
Tennessee whiskey